Derek Couture (born April 24, 1984) is a Canadian former professional ice hockey forward. He captained the Ontario Reign of the ECHL.

Playing career
Couture played four seasons (2000-2005) of major junior hockey in the Western Hockey League with the Saskatoon Blades. Undrafted, he turned professional with the 2005–06 season which he played in the American Hockey League (AHL) with the Omaha Ak-Sar-Ben Knights.

Personal
Retired from hockey in 2015, Derek transitioned into a career in Real Estate. He is a licensed Realtor for the premier Charles Real Estate group and eXp Realty.

Career statistics

References

External links

1984 births
Living people
Binghamton Senators players
Canadian ice hockey right wingers
Charlotte Checkers (1993–2010) players
Connecticut Whale (AHL) players
Elmira Jackals (ECHL) players
Hartford Wolf Pack players
Houston Aeros (1994–2013) players
Omaha Ak-Sar-Ben Knights players
Ontario Reign (ECHL) players
Quad City Flames players
Saskatoon Blades players
Seattle Thunderbirds players
Victoria Salmon Kings players
Canadian expatriate ice hockey players in the United States